The 2011–12 VMI Keydets basketball team represents the Virginia Military Institute in the 2011–12 NCAA Division I men's basketball season. In their 104th year of basketball, the Keydets of the Big South Conference are coached by Duggar Baucom currently in his seventh year.

Recruiting

Roster

Schedule

|-
!colspan=9| Regular Season

|-
!colspan=9| 2012 Big South Conference men's basketball tournament

References

VMI Keydets basketball seasons
VMI
VMI Keydets basketball team
VMI Keydets basketball team